Mumfordia is a genus of beetles in the family Latridiidae, containing the following species:

 Mumfordia monticola E.C. Zimmerman, 1935
 Mumfordia spinata Van Dyke, 1932

References

Latridiidae genera